Antone Dominique Stevenson (born December 28, 1977) is a former American football linebacker in the National Football League for the Buffalo Bills and Washington Redskins.  He played college football at the University of Tennessee and was drafted in the seventh round of the 2002 NFL Draft.

Early years
Stevenson attended and played high school football at Gaffney High School.

College career
Stevenson attended and played college football at the University of Tennessee. In the 2000 season, he appeared in 11 games. In the Florida game, he recorded an interception. In the 2001 season, he appeared in 11 games. In the victory over Notre Dame, he recorded an interception.

Professional career
Stevenson was drafted by the Buffalo Bills with the 260th overall pick in the seventh round of the 2002 NFL Draft.

Stevenson was a linebacker for the Buffalo Bills from 2002 to 2003 and for the Washington Redskins in 2004. In the 2002 season, he appeared in four games. In the 2003 season, he appeared in all 16 games. In the 2004 season, his last in the NFL, he appeared in one game.

Coaching career

Southern Methodist University 
 Internship Linebacker Coach 2008

Louisiana State University 
 Assistant to Secondary Coach 2010
 Assistant to Linebacker Coach 2009

Alabama State University 

Alabama State University Linebacker and Assistant Special Team Coach 2013-2014
Safeties Coach 2011-2012
Selected and attended the 2013 NFL Coaches Academy 
NFL Liaison

References

1977 births
Living people
People from Gaffney, South Carolina
Buffalo Bills players
Washington Redskins players
Tennessee Volunteers football players
American football linebackers